Zhen Wenhua (born March 8, 1967) is a former female shot put athlete from China. She competed at the 1992 Summer Olympics in Barcelona, Spain, finishing in twelfth place (17.81 metres) in the overall-rankings.

International competitions

References
sports-reference

1967 births
Living people
Chinese female shot putters
Olympic female shot putters
Olympic athletes of China
Athletes (track and field) at the 1992 Summer Olympics
Japan Championships in Athletics winners
20th-century Chinese women